, formerly known as the , also known as  or , is a Japanese animation studio established on October 22, 1946.

TMS is one of the oldest and most famous anime studios in Japan, best known for numerous anime franchises such as Lupin the Third, Lilpri, The Gutsy Frog, The Rose of Versailles, Anpanman, Detective Conan, Monster Rancher, Magic Knight Rayearth, Hamtaro, Sonic X, D.Gray-man, Kenichi: The Mightiest Disciple, Fruits Basket (since 2019), Obake no Q-Taro (until 1972), Bakugan Battle Brawlers and feature-length films Golgo 13: The Professional, Akira and Little Nemo: Adventures in Slumberland, alongside animation works for Western animation such as Adventures of Sonic the Hedgehog, Inspector Gadget, The Real Ghostbusters, Rainbow Brite, DuckTales, The New Adventures of Winnie the Pooh, Chip 'n Dale Rescue Rangers, Tiny Toon Adventures, Batman: The Animated Series, Animaniacs, and Spider-Man: The Animated Series.

In 2010, TMS Entertainment became a wholly owned subsidiary of Sega Sammy Holdings.

History 
The company was originally established on October 22, 1946 by Yutaka Fujioka. As Asahi Gloves Manufacturing Co., Ltd., it was originally a textile manufacturer. Later, the company name was changed to Asahi Ichi Henori Co., Ltd., Asahiichi Co., Ltd., Asahiichi Shine Industry Co., Ltd., and Kyokuichi Co., Ltd. In 2003, the company completely withdrew from the textile business.

Foray into animation 

The company started operations in 1964 when it ventured into the animation industry as  after the failure of Fujioka's previous studio, . The studio's first production was an animated adaptation of Osamu Tezuka's Big X.

Hayao Miyazaki was associated with Tokyo Movie before founding Studio Ghibli. His most notable work at TMS was his role as the director of The Castle of Cagliostro, which is notable for being his first feature-length debut.

In 1972, Madhouse was established with funding from Fujioka, and co-produced its earliest series with Tokyo Movie. In 1977, Fujioka reformatted Tokyo Movie into Tokyo Movie Shinsha. Its first production was Lupin the Third Part II, which aired from 1977 to 1980. The film adaptation, The Mystery of Mamo, was the studio's first feature-length movie in history. A subsidiary, Telecom Animation Film, was founded in 1975, but didn't start production until after Tokyo Movie was restructured.

In 1980, TMS established a partnership with the French (later American) company DiC, as one of its overseas animation subcontractors, where the former would help animate many of the latter's programs, starting with the pilot of Ulysses 31. The two would also produce the 1982 unaired pilot Lupin VIII. This partnership would last until 1996, when DiC opened its own Japan-based animation facility known as K.K. DIC Asia (later Creativity & Development Asia) in 1983, for animation production on its shows in order to bypass overseas animation subcontractors.

In 1989, TMS released Little Nemo: Adventures in Slumberland in Japan, followed by a United States in 1992. The movie was infamous for being in development hell with figures such as George Lucas, Chuck Jones, Hayao Miyazaki, and Gary Kurtz being involved with the movie before dropping out. The film receiving It received mixed reviews from critics, where it earned $11.4 million on a $35 million budget and was a box-office bomb. In response to this, founder Fujioka decided to retire from the animation business. TMS, having to recoup Little Nemos losses by increased production on locally based anime programs including Anpanman and the yearly Lupin III television specials which the specials ran non-stop until 2013 (with additional special produced in 2016, 2018 and 2019) while Telecom became highly involved in animation for Western-based productions due to the Japanese bubble economy busting making it difficult to find local work, including Tiny Toon Adventures, Animaniacs, and Batman: The Animated Series in order to fund for its next project Farewell to Nostradamus. 

Throughout the 1980s and the 1990s, TMS and its subsidiaries, Telecom Animation Film and South Korea-based Seoul Movie, animated for various companies, including DiC, Walt Disney Television Animation, Warner Bros. Animation, Marvel Films Animation, Studio Ghibli, Madhouse, Production I.G, Sunrise, Bones, Shogakukan Music & Digital Entertainment, and outsourced to smaller studios such as Telecom (its own division), Ajia-do, Magic Bus, Gonzo, Studio Jungle Gym, Nakamura Production, Tokyo Kids, DR Movie, and Orange. Since the early 2000s, TMS itself has no longer supplied animation services to western studios due to increasingly demanding costs. While it still produces feature films, these films are primarily spinoffs from existing anime properties, which include the likes of Anpanman and Detective Conan.

Aside from Hayao Miyazaki and Isao Takahata, animators would leave TMS to form their own studios. One of these studios was Brain's Base. Similarly, animators at its subsidiary, Telecom Animation Film, would leave to form Ufotable in 2000, which they would be later known for works like Demon Slayer: Kimetsu no Yaiba, Tales of Symphonia, The Garden of Sinners, Fate/Zero, and Fate/stay night: Unlimited Blade Works.

Partnership with Sega 
On July 1, 1991, Tokyo Movie Shinsha's holding company changed their name to Tokyo Movie Kyokuichi. In 1995, Tokyo Movie Kyokuichi merged with Tokyo Movie Shinsha. In 1996, the Los Angeles studio division was established for overseas TMS animation and in 2000, the company was re-branded as TMS Entertainment Co., Ltd.

In 2001, the Paris studio division was established. In 2003, American brokerage group Merrill Lynch became the second-largest shareholder in TMS Entertainment after acquiring a 7.54 percent stake in the studio. Merrill Lynch purchased the stake purely for investment purposes and had no intention of acquiring control of the firm's management.

On October 17, 2005, Sega Sammy Holdings announced that they had acquired a 50.2% majority stake in TMS and subsidized the studio under it.

In 2012, the head office was relocated to Nakano, Tokyo. In 2015, Sega Sammy placed TMS as a subsidiary of Sega Holdings. In April 2017, Sega's CG production division, Marza Animation Planet, became a subsidiary of TMS.

Subsidiaries 
The company has numerous animation subsidiaries collaborating in conjunction with the company. Those include:

 , a studio established on May 19, 1975. It first started as a subcontracting company for its parent, but has since become the leading animation studio behind the more recent Lupin the Third titles. The studio has also produced series like Chain Chronicle: The Light of Haecceitas, Orange, and Phantasy Star Online 2: The Animation.
 , a CG studio formerly a part of Sega and known for producing Space Pirate Captain Harlock, Resident Evil: Vendetta, and the 2020 Sonic the Hedgehog film.
 , a studio most known for co-producing the Detective Conan films since the 16th movie and the 2nd season (and OVAs) of Kamisama Kiss.
 , a studio most known for co-producing ReLIFE, Nana Maru San Batsu, and The Thousand Musketeers.
 , a studio best known for co-producing Bakuon!!, D.Gray-man Hallow, and Dr. Stone.
 , a studio known for producing The Pilot's Love Song, My Monster Secret, Sweetness and Lightning, and Megalobox.
 , a studio founded in March 2011, and known for producing the second half of the first season of Cardfight!! Vanguard and Brave 10.
 , a studio that produced Lupin III: Goodbye Partner, the 27th film special for the Lupin the Third franchise.
 Seoul Movie, a South Korean animation studio based in Seoul, established in 1990 and closed sometime in the late 2000s.

Productions

Television series

1960s

1970s

1980s

1990s

2000s

2010s

2020s

Feature films

Television films and specials

Original video animations

Original net animations

Video games

Foreign production history

TMS Entertainment/Telecom Animation Film

DiC Entertainment

Disney Television Animation

Warner Bros. Animation

Other productions

See also 
 Studio Ghibli, an animation studio founded by former TMS animators Hayao Miyazaki and Isao Takahata.
 Madhouse, an animation studio that was established with funding from TMS.
 Spectrum Animation, an animation studio founded by former TMS animators who helped animate several episodes of Batman: The Animated Series.
 Brain's Base, an animation studio founded by former TMS animators
 Ufotable, an animation studio founded by former Telecom Animation Film animators, a subsidiary of TMS.

Notes

References

External links 

  (for TMS Entertainment)
   (for TMS Entertainment)
   (for Telecom Animation Film Company)
 
 	
 
 
 
 
 
 
 
 
 
 
 co-productions database

 
Animation studios in Tokyo
Animax
Japanese animation studios
Japanese companies established in 1964
Mass media companies based in Tokyo
Mass media companies established in 1964
Sega Sammy Holdings
Shinjuku